is a Japanese footballer. He plays for SC Sagamihara.

Career
Naoto Hiraishi joined J3 League club; FC Machida Zelvia in 2015. He moved to Fujieda MYFC in 2016.

Club statistics
Updated to 23 February 2019.

References

External links

Profile at Fujieda MYFC

1992 births
Living people
Toyo University alumni
Association football people from Kanagawa Prefecture
Japanese footballers
J3 League players
FC Machida Zelvia players
Fujieda MYFC players
Blaublitz Akita players
Association football midfielders
SC Sagamihara players